Lonnie Thompson (born July 1, 1948), is an American paleoclimatologist and university professor in the School of Earth Sciences at Ohio State University. He has achieved global recognition for his drilling and analysis of ice cores from ice caps and mountain glaciers in the tropical and sub-tropical regions of the world. He and his wife, Ellen Mosley-Thompson, run the ice core paleoclimatology research group at the Byrd Polar Research Center.

Early life and education
Thompson was born July 1, 1948 in Gassaway, West Virginia and was raised there on a farm.  He obtained an undergraduate degree from Marshall University, majoring in geology. He subsequently attended Ohio State University where he received M.S. and Ph.D. degrees in geology.

Career and impact 
Thompson is one of the world’s foremost authorities on paleoclimatology and glaciology. For over 40 years, he has led 60 expeditions where they conduct ice-core drilling programs in the Polar Regions as well as on tropical and subtropical ice fields in 16 countries including China, Peru, Russia, Tanzania and Papua, Indonesia (New Guinea). He and his team from the Ohio State University have developed light-weight solar-powered drilling equipment for acquisition of histories from ice fields in the tropical South American Andes, the Himalayas, and on Mount Kilimanjaro in Tanzania. The results from these paleoclimate histories were published in more than 230 articles and have contributed toward improved understanding of Earth’s climate system, both past and present.

In the 1970s, he was the first scientist "to retrieve ice samples from a remote tropical ice cap, such as the Quelccaya Ice Cap in the Andes of Peru, and analyze them for ancient climate signals." He created the ice core research program at Ohio State while still a graduate student there. In regards to the dedication required to attain this ice, one author writes:

For comparison, the Everest lower base camp is at 5,380 m (17,700 ft) and the upper base camp is at 6,500 m (21,300 ft). (The mountain itself is 8,848 m (29,029 ft).) Rolling Stone magazine says that there is no person in the world who has spent more time above 18,000 feet than Lonnie Thompson.

His observations of glacier retreat (1970s–2000s) "confirm that glaciers around the world are melting and provide clear evidence that the warming of the last 50 years is now outside the range of climate variability for several millennia, if not longer." In 2001, he incorrectly predicted that the famed snows of Africa's Mount Kilimanjaro would melt within the next 20 years, a victim of climate change across the tropics. Return expeditions to the mountain have shown that changes in the mountain's ice fields may signal an even quicker melting of its snow fields, which Thompson documented had existed for thousands of years. Thompson and his wife both served as advisers for the Academy Award-winning 2006 documentary An Inconvenient Truth, by Al Gore, Jr., and some of their work was referenced in the movie.

Personal life 
Lonnie Thompson has been married to Ellen Mosley-Thompson for more than 40 years. They met in the 1970s in the Marshall University while he was studying geology and she was pursuing a degree in physics. After their graduation, they both pursued graduate degrees in geology at the Ohio State University. They are now research partners who are both interested in examining the effects of climate change on the world's glacial regions and in developing the technology to drill deep in the ice.

On May 1, 2012, he underwent a successful heart transplant.

Honors and awards 
2001: Thompson was featured among eighteen scientists and researchers as "America's Best" by CNN and Time Magazine.
2002: Thompson was awarded the Dr A.H. Heineken Prize for Environmental Sciences by the Royal Netherlands Academy of Arts and Sciences.
2002: Thompson was awarded the Vega Medal by the Swedish Society for Anthropology and Geography.
2005: Thompson was elected to the National Academy of Sciences.
November, 2005: Thompson was featured in a "Rolling Stone" article, "The Ice Hunter".
2005: Thompson was awarded the prestigious Tyler Prize for Environmental Achievement, an honor often regarded as the environmental science equivalent to the Nobel Prize. 
2006: Thompson was elected to the American Philosophical Society.
February, 2007: Mosley-Thompson and Thompson were jointly awarded the Roy Chapman Andrews Society Distinguished Explorer Award at Beloit College, Beloit, WI.
May, 2007: Thompson is named to receive the National Medal of Science.  This honor is the highest the United States can bestow upon an American scientist. It was presented to Thompson by President Bush in July 2007 (Award year 2005). 
2007: Thompson was awarded Seligman Crystal by the International Glaciological Society. The Crystal is considered to be one of the highest awards in glaciology.
2008: Mosley-Thompson and Thompson share the $1 million Dan David Prize (Future category) with British researcher Geoffrey Eglinton.
2008: Thompson was listed as one of Time Magazine's Heroes of the Environment.
2012: Mosley-Thompson and Thompson were jointly awarded the Benjamin Franklin Medal in Earth and Environmental Science from the Franklin Institute.
2013: International Science and Technology Cooperation Award, China
2021: BBVA Foundation Frontiers of Knowledge Award in the category "Climate Change".

Publications 

Lonnie Thompson has been awarded 53 research grants from the NSF, NASA, NOAA and NGS and has published 165 papers. An abbreviated list of expeditions, grants, and publications can be found in his Ohio State curriculum vitae (PDF).

Some notable publications include:

References

External links 
Ice Core Paleoclimatology Research Group, the Thompson's research group at OSU.
Lonnie Thompson's web page at Byrd Polar
Ellen Mosley-Thompson's web page at Byrd Polar
Lonnie Thompson's Department of Geological Sciences faculty home page
Ellen Mosley-Thompson's Department of Geography faculty home page
 "Rapid Climate Change in the Earth System: Past,Present,Future" 2002 Heineken Prize lecture by Prof. Thompson
Lonnie Thompson, biography from the Encyclopedia of World Biography
"Deciphering the ice: scientist drills into tropical glaciers for clues to Earth's climate changes" from CNN/Time.
"Science Goes to New Heights", article about Thompson's research in The Antarctic Sun. June 27, 2008
 The Habitable Planet video
Dan David Prize laureate 2008
 WOSU Public Media profiled the Thompson's polar research in 2008 in a two video segments distributed nationally.

Ohio State University faculty
Ohio State University Graduate School alumni
20th-century American geologists
Living people
National Medal of Science laureates
American climatologists
Paleoclimatologists
1948 births
Members of the United States National Academy of Sciences
Foreign members of the Chinese Academy of Sciences
People from Gassaway, West Virginia
Scientists from West Virginia
Marshall University alumni
Winners of the Heineken Prize
American Antarctic scientists
Members of the American Philosophical Society
21st-century American geologists